Voice of the Hill was a local print newspaper that covered the Capitol Hill neighborhood in Washington DC. It was founded by Bruce and Adele Robey and Stephanie Cavanaugh and was owned by The Current Newspapers. Voice of the Hill was then the only newspaper that had a web presence. On 5 May 2010, it was announced that Voice of the Hill would cease publication due to a decline in advertising revenue. This was a few months after Bruce Robey's death.

References 

Newspapers published in Washington, D.C.
Defunct newspapers published in Washington, D.C.
Defunct monthly newspapers